Redwood is a common name for a group of coniferous trees.

Redwood may also refer to:

Plants
Broadleaf
 Family Fabaceae (legume family)
 Caesalpinia echinata – South American redwood
 Caesalpinia sappan – East Indian redwood
 Family Rosaceae (rose family)
 Hagenia abyssinica – (East) African redwood
 Family Sterculiaceae
 Trochetiopsis erythroxylon,  St Helena Redwood
Colubrina ferruginosa, the redwood of the Bahamas
Pterocarpus dalbergioides, or Andaman wood
Pterocarpus santalinus, a red dye wood of India

Conifers
 Family Cupressaceae, cypresses
 Metasequoia glyptostroboides, dawn redwood
 Sequoia sempervirens, coast redwood
 Albino redwood
 Sequoiadendron giganteum, giant sequoia
 Family Pinaceae (pines)
 The wood of Scots pine (Pinus sylvestris), sometimes called "redwood" in the timber trade

Eucalypts
 Family Myrtaceae
 Eucalyptus transcontinentalis, redwood

Parks
Giant Forest, California
Giant Sequoia National Monument, California
Humboldt Redwoods State Park
List of giant sequoia groves, California
Muir Woods National Monument, California
Redwood National and State Parks, in Northern California
Del Norte Coast Redwoods State Park, California 
Jedediah Smith Redwoods State Park, California
Prairie Creek Redwoods State Park, California

Places

Australia
Redwood, Queensland

Canada
Redwood Meadows, Alberta

Ireland
Redwood, County Tipperary
Redwood Castle

New Zealand
Redwood, Christchurch
Redwood, Wellington
Redwood Railway Station

United States
Redwood Creek (disambiguation)

California
Redwood City, California
Redwood City Sequoia Station 
Redwood Empire, a region in Northern California
Redwood Highway (disambiguation)
Redwood National and State Parks
Redwood Shores, California
Redwood Valley AVA, California wine region in Mendocino County
The "Redwood train", otherwise known as the California Western Railroad

Minnesota
Redwood County, Minnesota 
Redwood Falls, Minnesota
Redwood Falls Township, Minnesota 
Redwood River, a tributary of the Minnesota River, in southwestern Minnesota

Utah
UTA rail stations
Redwood Junction (UTA station), in the Redwood neighborhood of West Valley City
West Jordan City Center (UTA station), formerly known as Redwood

Other states
Redwood (Bar Harbor, Maine)
Redwood, Mississippi
Redwood, New York
Redwood, Oregon 
Redwood, Texas

People
 Bernard Boverton Redwood (1874–1911), British motorboat racer
 Charlie Redwood (1878–1954), Australian rugby union player
 Francis Redwood (1839–1935), Roman Catholic Archbishop of Wellington
 George Redwood (1885–1956), English footballer
 Henry Redwood (1823–1907) New Zealand farmer, politician and racehorse breeder
 John Redwood (born 1951), British politician
 Stanley Redwood (born 1965), Jamaican minister and former politician from the People's National Party
 Vernon Redwood (1873–1954), member of the Queensland Legislative Assembly

Art, entertainment, and media

Fictional entities
Redwood Cigarettes, spoof of Marlboro cigarettes in the Grand Theft Auto series
Sons of Anarchy Motorcycle Club Redwood Original (SAMCRO), a fictional motorcycle club in the FX television series Sons of Anarchy

Film
The Redwoods, a 1967 short documentary film

Music
Artists
Redwood (band)
Albums
Redwood (album), by Lúnasa
Songs
"Redwoods" (Scale the Summit song)
"Redwood Tree" (song), by Van Morrison

Education
College of the Redwoods
Redwood High School (disambiguation)

Enterprises
Redwood Games
Redwood Library and Athenaeum
Redwood Materials, Inc.

Sports
"Redwood Forest", nickname for the 1969 Kansas City Chiefs
The Redwoods Lacrosse Club in the Premier Lacrosse League

Other uses
Redwood, the callsign for Virgin America
Redwood, a codename used by ATI for some graphics cards in the Evergreen GPU family